Tržišče may refer to:

Tržišče, Rogaška Slatina, a settlement in the Municipality of Rogaška Slatina, northeastern Slovenia
Tržišče, Sevnica, a settlement in the Municipality of Sevnica, central Slovenia